Tinga may refer to:

Tinga (given name)
 Tinga Stewart, Jamaican reggae singer

Tinga (surname)
 Dante Tinga, incumbent Associate Justice of the Supreme Court of the Philippines

Nickname
 "Tinga", Brazilian footballer Guilherme de Jesus da Silva
 "Tinga", Brazilian footballer Paulo César Fonseca do Nascimento
 "Tinga", Brazilian footballer Paulo Edson Nascimento Costa
 "Tinga", Brazilian footballer Luiz Otávio Santos de Araújo
 "Tinga", former Kenyan Prime Minister Raila Odinga

Other
 Tinga, an ancient name for Tangier
 Tinga, a genre of popular Music of Guinea-Bissau
 Tinga (dish), a Mexican dish usually prepared with shredded beef or chicken